Lynda Barnes (née Norry, born October 7, 1967) is one of the world's leading female tenpin bowlers. She is a former member of the PWBA (Professional Women's Bowling Association). Bowling as an amateur, Lynda won the 1998 USBC Queens championship, then known as the WIBC Queens. In 1999, Lynda married Chris Barnes, a leading bowler on the Professional Bowlers Association (PBA) tour. The couple's twin sons, Troy and Ryan, were born in May 2002. Lynda is a former member of Team USA.

In 2005, along with Paul Moor of England, she was named the 2005 World Bowling Writers Bowler of the Year.

Lynda appears briefly in the 2006 documentary A League of Ordinary Gentlemen, as her husband was one of four PBA bowlers highlighted in the film.

In August 2006, Lynda competed in the USBC Women's Challenge tournament held at a mall in Las Vegas. The made-for-TV event was later shown on ESPN in a weekly format throughout September and October.  She also qualified 7th in the 2007 U.S. Women's Open and fought her way through match play to make the four-person televised finals. She lost her semifinal match to finish in a tie for third place.

On April 30, 2008, Barnes won her second career USBC Queens title in an event televised by ESPN2. Entering the finals as the top seed from qualifying, she defeated Amy Stolz, 215-195, to earn a PWBA major title and the $30,000 first-place prize. 

Less than two weeks later, on May 11, Barnes defeated four-time PBA titlist Sean Rash 258-237 in the finals of the first USBC "Bowling's Clash of the Champions." Barnes cashed $50,000 in this made-for-television event, broadcast nationally in the USA by CBS. It marked the first time that a woman defeated a man in a televised championship bowling match. The following year, she participated in the second and final USBC "Bowling's Clash of the Champions." Although she was eliminated in the first stage, her husband defeated Rebekah Diers in the championship match by a 257-207 victory. Both she and Chris are the only players to win the USBC Clash of Champions.

Barnes made her second U.S. Women's Open televised finals appearance in 2012, but she lost her opening match to finish in fifth place.

Kelly Kulick and Liz Johnson followed Barnes when they both defeated a man during a televised championship match in bowling. Kulick and Johnson, however, have both won PBA Tour titles. Kulick won the 2010 PBA Tournament of Champions and Johnson won the PBA Chameleon Championship during the 2017 PBA World Series of Bowling.

Lynda's Bio

Hometown: Double Oak, Texas

Birth date: Oct. 7, 1967

Height: 1.63 m (5 feet, 4 inches)

Right/left-handed: Right

Highest certified game: 300 (6)

Highest certified series: 806

 Team USA Appearances: 1989, 1990, 1991, 1992, 1996, 1997, 1998, 2005, 2006, 2007*
 Barnes was granted an exemption for the 2007 team by the National Selection Committee following the 2006 USBC Team USA Championships

Career highlights

International:
 2005 Qubica AMF World Cup champion
 Two silver medals (team and all-events) and two bronze (Masters and doubles) at 2005 Women’s World Championships
 Three gold medals (team, all-events and doubles), one silver (singles) and one bronze (Masters) at 2005 American Zone Championships
 1998 WIBC Queens champion
 Two gold medals (team, Masters) and one bronze (trios) at 1997 American Zone Championships
 1997 British Open champion
 Gold medal at 1997 United Arab Emirates Invitational
 Gold medal at 1997 Africa Cup
 5th at 1997 South African Open
 7th at 1996 AMF World Cup
 Silver medal at 1996 World Tenpin Team Cup
 Five gold medals (singles, doubles, team, all-events, national all-events) at 1996 Tournament of the Americas
 Two gold medals and one silver at 1989 World Youth Championships
 Gold (team), silver (Masters) and two bronze medals (doubles, trios) at 1989 American Zone Championships
 Gold medal (team) at 1991 Pan American Games
 Silver (singles) and bronze medal (trios) at 1991 World Championships

National:
 3rd at 2011 U.S. Women's Open
 5th at 2010 U.S. Women's Open
 1st at 2008 Bowling's Clash of the Champions presented by USBC
 1st at 2008 USBC Queens
 Semi-finalist at the 2007 U.S. Women's Open
 1995, 2005 and 2007 U.S. Amateur champion
 4th at 2006 USBC Team USA Championships
 1998 and 2004 WIBC Tournament Doubles champion (set record score in 2004 with Carolyn Dorin-Ballard)
 1st at 1998 USBC Queens
 1997 LPBT Fort Worth Regional Mixed Doubles champion
 4th at 1997 USA Bowling National Amateur Championships
 3rd at 1996 USA Bowling National Amateur Championships
 5th at 1991 WIBC Queens
 4th at 1991 USA Bowling National Amateur Championships
 2nd at 1990 USA Bowling National Amateur Championships
 4th at 1989 USA Bowling National Amateur Championships
 1989 Association of College Unions International champion
 5th at 1988 USA Bowling National Amateur Championships

Awards:
 2016 BPAA Dick Weber Bowling Ambassador Award
 2006 World Bowling Writers International Bowling Hall of Fame
 2005 World Bowling Writers Female Bowler of the Year
 2004-05 Bowlers Journal All-America first team
 2004 WIBC All-American second team
 1998 USOC Bowler of the Year
 1998 Bowlers Journal Amateur Bowler of the Year
 1997 Bowling Writers Association of America Amateur Bowler of the Year
 1997 WIBC All-American team (first amateur to be selected in history)
 1996 Bowlers Journal Amateur All-American team
 1991 Bowling Writers Association of America Bowler of the Year
 1990 California Star of Tomorrow
 1989 WIBC Alberta E. Crowe Star of Tomorrow
 1989 National Collegiate Bowling Championships All-Tournament team (San Jose State)
 1989 World Youth Championships Sportsmanship Award
 1989-90 National Collegiate Bowling Coaches Association Most Valuable Player
 1988-89 and 1989-90 Bowling Writers Association of American Collegiate Bowler of the Year
 1988-89 and 1989-90 National Collegiate Bowling Coaches Association All-American first team
 1986-87 and 1987-88 National Collegiate Bowling Coaches Association Collegiate All-American second team
 Diablo Women’s Bowling Association Hall of Fame
 14-time member of Northern California All-Star team

References

Barnes, Lynda
Living people
1967 births
Bowling broadcasters
Pan American Games medalists in bowling
Pan American Games gold medalists for the United States
Medalists at the 1991 Pan American Games